La Tropicale Amissa Bongo is a road cycling race held in Gabon, as a 2.1 category event on the UCI Africa Tour. The race consists of only a men's competition, a race run over seven stages. The race is named in honor of Albertine Amissa Bongo.

Past winners

References

External links
 Results
 artek.fr
 

 
Cycle races in Gabon
UCI Africa Tour races
Recurring sporting events established in 2006
2006 establishments in Gabon